Columbia Center is a shopping mall located in northwestern Kennewick, Washington, owned by Simon Property Group.  It is the largest mall in southeastern Washington, with two Macy's stores (both formerly The Bon Marché) and JCPenney as its anchors. It opened in 1969, and has undergone two major renovations. In 1988, the expansion opened anchors Sears and Lamonts (later Gottschalks, The Bon Marché Men's and Children's, now Macy's Men's and Children's). The second in 1997 on the site of a former Pay 'n Save, brought Barnes & Noble, Old Navy, plus a renovated eight-screen Regal Cinemas (Columbia Center 8), which closed in July 2018, and was demolished for a Dick's Sporting Goods that opened in Fall 2019.

On December 28, 2018, it was announced that Sears would be closing as part of a plan to close 80 stores nationwide. The store closed in March 2019.

References

External links
 Columbia Center Official Site
 Mall directory
 Simon Malls

Tri-Cities, Washington
Shopping malls in Washington (state)
Shopping malls established in 1969
Simon Property Group
Buildings and structures in Benton County, Washington
Tourist attractions in Benton County, Washington
Kennewick, Washington
1969 establishments in Washington (state)